Jacques Georges Habib Hafouri (August 20, 1916 – May 4, 2011) was a Syrian Bishop of the  Syriac Catholic Church. He was the oldest Syrian Catholic bishop.

Hafouri was born in Damas, Syria, and was ordained a priest on January 28, 1940. Hafouri was appointed Bishop of Archeparchy of Hassaké-Nisibi Diocese on March 18, 1982, and ordained bishop on August 13, 1982. He remained bishop of the eparchy until his retirement on June 28, 1996.

See also 

 Our Lady of Soufanieh

Notes

Syriac Catholic bishops
1916 births
2011 deaths
People from Damascus
Eastern Catholic bishops in Syria